Sir Isaac Bayley Balfour, KBE, FRS, FRSE (31 March 1853 – 30 November 1922) was a Scottish botanist. He was Regius Professor of Botany at the University of Glasgow from 1879 to 1885, Sherardian Professor of Botany at the University of Oxford from 1884 to 1888, and Professor of Botany at the University of Edinburgh from 1888 to 1922.

Early life
He was the son of John Hutton Balfour, also a botanist, and Marion Spottiswood Bayley, and was born at home, 27 Inverleith Row, Edinburgh. His mother was granddaughter of George Husband Baird.

He was the cousin of Sir James Crichton-Browne.

Biography
Balfour was educated at the Edinburgh Academy from 1864 to 1870. At this early stage his interests and abilities were in the biological sciences, which were taught to him by his father. Due to his father's post as Professor of Botany at Edinburgh, the young Balfour was able to visit the Edinburgh Botanical Gardens, not open to the public at the time.

Balfour studied at the University of Edinburgh, from which he graduated with first class honours in 1873, and at the universities in Würzburg and Strasbourg.

In 1874 Balfour participated in an astronomical expedition of 1874 to Rodrigues. Though the stated aim of the mission was to observe Venus, Balfour used the opportunity to investigate the local flora, and on his return, the fieldwork he had carried out permitted him to gain his doctorate.

In 1879, his father resigned the chair at Edinburgh, Glasgow professor Alexander Dickson (1836–1887) was appointed in his place, and the younger Balfour was promoted to the chair of Regius Professor of Botany, Glasgow in Glasgow from 1879 to 1885. He also went on to lead an expedition to Socotra in 1880.

In 1884, he was appointed Sherardian Professor of Botany at the University of Oxford. In the same year he married Agnes Boyd Balloch.

It was, however, after his return to Edinburgh to take up his father's old chair as Professor of Botany from 1888 to 1922 that Balfour left his mark, as he was also appointed 9th Regius Keeper of the Royal Botanic Garden Edinburgh. His father had greatly enlarged the botanical gardens during his tenure, but Balfour completely transformed them. Having put their finances on a safer footing by transferring them to the crown, Balfour engaged himself in a major reform of the gardens, establishing a proper botanical institute, and largely redeveloping the layout of the gardens to have a proper arboretum, building new laboratories and improving scientific facilities. He was awarded KBE in the 1920 civilian war honours list.

He died at Court Hill, Haslemere in Surrey.

Family

In 1884 he married Agnes Boyd Balloch. Their daughter Isabel Marion Agnes (Senga) Bayley Balfour, married the diplomat Francis Aglen and was mother to Anthony John Aglen.

Specific interests
Balfour's interest in Sino-Himalayan plants also put him in contact with botanist and plant collector Reginald Farrer. Farrer provided valuable information to Balfour and the Royal Botanic Garden Edinburgh by sending him his plant illustrations together with the field notes, botanical specimens and seeds he had collected.

Honours, qualifications and appointments
 1873: Awarded Bachelor of Science degree (BSc) with first class honours, University of Edinburgh
 1873–1878: Appointed Lecturer in Botany, Royal Veterinary College, Edinburgh
 1875: Awarded Doctor of Science degree (DSc), University of Edinburgh
 1877: Awarded Bachelor of Medicine, Bachelor of Surgery degree (MB, ChB), University of Edinburgh
 1877: Elected Fellow of the Royal Society of Edinburgh
 1879: Appointed Professor of Botany, University of Glasgow
 1880–1882, 1904–1906: President of the Botanical Society of Edinburgh
 1884: Awarded Master of Arts degree (MA), University of Oxford
 1884: Elected Fellow of the Royal Society
 1884: Appointed Professor of Botany, University of Oxford
 1888: Appointed Professor of Botany, University of Edinburgh
 1897: Awarded Victoria Medal of Honour, Royal Horticultural Society
 1901: Awarded Doctor of Laws degree (LLD), University of Glasgow
 1919: Awarded Linnean Medal of the Linnean Society
 1920: Awarded Knight Commander of the Order of the British Empire (KBE)
 1921: Awarded Honorary Doctor of Laws degree (LLD), University of Edinburgh

Commemoration

The Benmore Estate was gifted to the nation by Harry George Younger of the Younger's family, and in 1928 he had the Bayley Balfour Memorial Hut, dedicated to Sir Isaac, placed in Puck's Glen. It was designed by Sir Robert Lorimer, with wooden panels using every variety of timber grown at Benmore. It also commemorated the contribution of James Duncan, a previous owner of the estate. The woodland was taken over by the Forestry Commission, which dedicated the area around the glen to the memory of Sir Isaac, while the central part of the estate was opened in 1929 as the Younger Botanic Garden, the first outstation of the Royal Botanic Garden Edinburgh. In 1968 the Bayley Balfour Memorial Hut was restored, and moved to a new site in the walled garden of Benmore House.

Balfour is commemorated in the scientific name of a species of Socotran lizard, Mesalina balfouri. and of the Socotran butterfly Charaxes balfourii.

References

External links

1853 births
1922 deaths
Scottish botanists
People educated at Edinburgh Academy
Alumni of the University of Edinburgh
Fellows of the Royal Society
Victoria Medal of Honour recipients
Fellows of the Royal Society of Edinburgh
Academics of the University of Glasgow
University of Strasbourg alumni
University of Würzburg alumni
Sherardian Professors of Botany
Academics of the University of Edinburgh
Isaac Bayley
Knights Commander of the Order of the British Empire